Shayda is a 2023 Australian drama film directed and written by Noora Niasari. The film stars Zar Amir Ebrahimi, Mojean Aria, Leah Purcell, Jillian Nguyen and Osamah Sami. It had its world premiere at the 2023 Sundance Film Festival on 19 January 2023.

Cast 

 Zar Amir Ebrahimi as Shayda
 Osamah Sami as Hossein
 Leah Purcell as Joyce
 Jillian Nguyen as Vi
 Mojean Aria as Farhad
 Selina Zahednia as Mona
 Rina Mousavi as Elly
 Eloise Gentle as Downtown Shopper
 Eve Morey as Lara
 Lucinda Armstrong Hall as Renee
 Meaghan Fahy as Downtown shopper
 Bev Killick as Cathy
 Aurnab As-Saber as Persian Man
 Justine Jones as Commuter
 Korab Shasivari as Festival Attendees
 Victoria Babatsikos as New Years Eve Party Goer
 Eliza Hall as Downtown Shopper
 Mert Ergec as Passenger

Reception

Critical response 
On review aggregator website Rotten Tomatoes, the film has an approval rating of 100% based on 17 reviews, with an average rating of 7.6/10.

Accolades

References

External links 
 

2023 films
Australian drama films